Bojana Stefanović is a Serbian actress. She is best known for her role as Nadja in the series Ono kao ljubav (Thing as love). She is married to Serbian director Istok Tornjanski with whom she has a son and a daughter.

References

External links

1980 births
Living people
Serbian stage actresses
Serbian film actresses
Serbian television actresses
21st-century Serbian actresses
Actresses from Belgrade